Grease is a solid or semisolid lubricant formed as a dispersion of thickening agents in a liquid lubricant. Grease generally consists of a soap emulsified with mineral or vegetable oil.

A common feature of greases is that they possess a high initial viscosity, which upon the application of shear, drops to give the effect of an oil-lubricated bearing of approximately the same viscosity as the base oil used in the grease. This change in viscosity is called shear thinning.  Grease is sometimes used to describe lubricating materials that are simply soft solids or high viscosity liquids, but these materials do not exhibit the shear-thinning properties characteristic of the classical grease. For example, petroleum jellies such as Vaseline are not generally classified as greases.

Greases are applied to mechanisms that can be lubricated only infrequently and where a lubricating oil would not stay in position. They also act as sealants to prevent ingress of water and incompressible materials. Grease-lubricated bearings have greater frictional characteristics because of their high viscosity.

Properties
A true grease consists of an oil and/or other fluid lubricant that is mixed with a thickener, typically a soap, to form a solid or semisolid. Greases are usually shear-thinning or pseudo-plastic fluids, which means that the viscosity of the fluid is reduced under shear. After sufficient force to shear the grease has been applied, the viscosity drops and approaches that of the base lubricant, such as the mineral oil. This sudden drop in shear force means that grease is considered a plastic fluid, and the reduction of shear force with time makes it thixotropic. A few greases are rheotropic, meaning they become more viscous when worked.  It is often applied using a grease gun, which applies the grease to the part being lubricated under pressure, forcing the solid grease into the spaces in the part.

Thickeners

Soaps are the most common emulsifying agent used, and the selection of the type of soap is determined by the application. Soaps include calcium stearate, sodium stearate, lithium stearate, as well as mixtures of these components. Fatty acids derivatives other than stearates are also used, especially lithium 12-hydroxystearate. The nature of the soaps influences the temperature resistance (relating to the viscosity), water resistance, and chemical stability of the resulting grease. Calcium sulphonates and polyureas are increasingly common grease thickeners not based on metallic soaps.

Powdered solids may also be used as thickeners, especially as clays. Fatty oil-based greases have also been prepared with other thickeners, such as tar, graphite, or mica, which also increase the durability of the grease.  Silicone greases are generally thickened with silica.

Engineering assessment and analysis
Lithium-based greases are the most commonly used; sodium and lithium-based greases have higher melting point (dropping point) than calcium-based greases but are not resistant to the action of water. Lithium-based grease has a dropping point at 190 to 220 °C (350 to 400 °F). However the maximum usable temperature for lithium-based grease is 120 °C.

The amount of grease in a sample can be determined in a laboratory by extraction with a solvent followed by e.g. gravimetric determination.

Additives
Some greases are labeled "EP", which indicates "extreme pressure". Under high pressure or shock loading, normal grease can be compressed to the extent that the greased parts come into physical contact, causing friction and wear. EP greases have increased resistance to film breakdown, form sacrificial coatings on the metal surface to protect if the film does break down, or include solid lubricants such as graphite or molybdenum disulfide to provide protection even without any grease remaining.

Solid additives such as copper or ceramic powder are added to some greases for static high pressure and/or high temperature applications, or where corrosion could prevent dis-assembly of components later in their service life. These compounds are working as a release agent.  Solid additives cannot be used in bearings because of tight tolerances. Solid additives will cause increased wear in bearings.

History
Grease from the early Egyptian or Roman eras is thought to have been prepared by combining lime with olive oil.  The lime saponifies some of the triglyceride that comprises oil to give a calcium grease. In the middle of the 19th century, soaps were intentionally added as thickeners to oils.  Over the centuries, all manner of materials have been employed as greases.  For example, black slugs Arion ater were used as axle-grease to lubricate wooden axle-trees or carts in Sweden.

Classification and standards

Jointly developed by ASTM International, the National Lubricating Grease Institute (NLGI) and SAE International, standard  “standard classification and specification for automotive service greases” was first published in 1989 by ASTM International. It categorizes greases suitable for the lubrication of chassis components and wheel bearings of vehicles, based on performance requirements, using codes adopted from the NLGI's “chassis and wheel bearing service classification system”:
LA and LB: chassis lubricants (suitability up to mild and severe duty respectively)
GA, GB and GC: wheel-bearings (suitability up to mild, moderate and severe duty respectively)
A given performance category may include greases of different consistencies.

The measure of the consistency of grease is commonly expressed by its NLGI consistency number.

The main elements of standard  and NLGI's consistency classification are reproduced and described in standard  “automotive lubricating greases” published by SAE International.

Standard  “lubricants, industrial oils and related products (class L) — classification — part 9: family X (greases)”, first released in 1987 by the International Organization for Standardization, establishes a detailed classification of greases used for the lubrication of equipment, components of machines, vehicles, etc. It assigns a single multi-part code to each grease based on its operational properties (including temperature range, effects of water, load, etc.) and its NLGI consistency number.

Other types

Silicone grease

Silicone grease is based on a silicone oil, usually thickened with amorphous fumed silica.

Fluoroether-based grease
Fluoropolymers containing C-O-C (ether) with fluorine (F) bonded to the carbon.  They are more flexible and often used in demanding environments due to their inertness. Fomblin by Solvay Solexis and Krytox by duPont are prominent examples.

Laboratory grease

Apiezon, silicone-based, and fluoroether-based greases are all used commonly in laboratories for lubricating stopcocks and ground glass joints. The grease helps to prevent joints from "freezing", as well as ensuring high vacuum systems are properly sealed.  Apiezon or similar hydrocarbon based greases are the cheapest, and most suitable for high vacuum applications. However, they dissolve in many organic solvents. This quality makes clean-up with pentane or hexanes trivial, but also easily leads to contamination of reaction mixtures.

Silicone-based greases are cheaper than fluoroether-based greases. They are relatively inert and generally do not affect reactions, though reaction mixtures often get contaminated (detected through NMR near δ 0). Silicone-based greases are not easily removed with solvent, but they are removed efficiently by soaking in a base bath.

Fluoroether-based greases are inert to many substances including solvents, acids, bases, and oxidizers. They are, however, expensive, and are not easily cleaned away.

Food-grade grease
Food-grade greases are those greases that come in contact with food.  Food-grade lubricant base oil are generally low sulfur petrochemical, less easily oxidized and emulsified.  Another commonly used poly-α olefin base oil as well  The United States Department of Agriculture (USDA) has three food-grade designations: H1, H2 and H3.  H1 lubricants are food-grade lubricants used in food-processing environments where there is the possibility of incidental food contact.  H2 lubricants are industrial lubricants used on equipment and machine parts in locations with no possibility of contact.  H3 lubricants are food-grade lubricants, typically edible oils, used to prevent rust on hooks, trolleys and similar equipment.

Water-soluble grease analogs
In some cases, the lubrication and high viscosity of a grease are desired in situations where non-toxic, non-oil based materials are required.  Carboxymethyl cellulose, or CMC, is one popular material used to create a water-based analog of greases.  CMC serves to both thicken the solution and add a lubricating effect, and often silicone-based lubricants are added for additional lubrication.  The most familiar example of this type of lubricant, used as a surgical and personal lubricant, is K-Y Jelly.

Cork grease

Cork grease is a lubricant used to lubricate cork, for example in musical wind instruments.  It is usually applied using small lip-balm/lip-stick like applicators.

See also

 Bearing (mechanical)
 Lubrication
 Lubrication theory
 Penetrant
 Society of Tribologists and Lubrication Engineers
 Timken OK Load

References

External links
U.S. Army Corps of Engineers grease definition and application guide (PDF file)

New location: Navigate to USACE Home > [Publications] > [Engineer Manuals] > [EM 1110-2-1424 Lubricants and Hydraulic Fluids]
 U.S. Army Corps of Engineers grease definition and application guide (PDF file)
 The Grocer's Encyclopedia online.
 Interflon USA  "What is the difference between oil and grease?"

Greases
Tribology